Canadian Expat Association is a registered Canadian lobby that focuses on creating awareness amongst Canadians and legislators of the value of the Canadian expat community and issues faced by Canadians living abroad.  The association was founded in 2007 and publishes newsletters for its members.

Headquartered in Ottawa, Ontario, the organization is managed by the following individuals: Mr. Allan Nichols (President), and Mr. Ivan Ross Vrána (Executive Director) in Ottawa.

The CEA offers a variety of services for their members including Travel Service, a network of Regional Contacts around the world, a Global Directory of businesses serving the local Canadian expat population, and a job bank for members to search.

In September 2011, it was announced that Tim Hortons had become a Corporate Founding Member of the association.

References 
Canadian expat value
CEA in Qatar
Advocacy Bill C-37

External links 
 Office of the Commissioner of Lobbying of Canada
Matador Network - Controversy in Canada expats, aid workers and citizenship
Global BC - Who are Canada's most influential expats?
National Post - Michael J. Fox named most influential expat
National Post - Expat group calls citizenship changes unfair
Supreme Court of Canada hearing the case for voting rights for Canadian Expats
Canadian Expat Association website
Travel Services with the Canadian Expat

Migration-related organizations
Diaspora organizations in Canada
Organizations established in 2007
2007 establishments in Canada